Princeton is a small unincorporated rural village in Princeton Township, Dallas County, Arkansas, United States, located at the junction of Arkansas highways 8 and 9,  southwest of Carthage. Princeton Cemetery, which is listed on the National Register of Historic Places, is located in the community. It was first listed as a CDP in the 2020 census with a population of 13.

There is a small store with gas pumps, a church, and a village park, along with scattered houses.  Princeton was a thriving pre-Civil War community, and until 1908 was the county seat of Dallas County; it once had its own public school system, post office, and boasted 4 doctors and a dentist in practice.

Demographics

2020 census

Note: the US Census treats Hispanic/Latino as an ethnic category. This table excludes Latinos from the racial categories and assigns them to a separate category. Hispanics/Latinos can be of any race.

Education
It is in the Fordyce School District, which operates Fordyce High School.

References

Unincorporated communities in Dallas County, Arkansas
Unincorporated communities in Arkansas
Census-designated places in Arkansas
Census-designated places in Dallas County, Arkansas